Will Lee is an American bassist known for his work on the Late Show with David Letterman as part of the CBS Orchestra and before that "The World's Most Dangerous Band" when Letterman hosted the NBC "Late Night" show.

Lee has recorded and toured with many artists. He appeared on the Mark & Clark Band's hit record Worn Down Piano. He performs with his Beatles tribute band, The Fab Faux, which he co-founded in 1998.

Career

Beginnings in music 
Lee was greatly influenced to pursue music because of his parents. His father, William Franklin Lee III played piano, trumpet and the upright bass professionally. Lee's mother Lois sang with big bands. Lee took up drums after seeing the Beatles on The Ed Sullivan Show, and by the time he was 12 had formed his first band in Miami. The band members each earned $9 a night playing the popular surfing tunes characteristic of the 60s. With the great numbers of drummers in Miami, Lee shifted to bass, an instrument that offered more opportunities. Lee was part of a succession of bands including top 40 bands with names like "Chances R" "The Loving Kind", and "Green Cloud."

Lee studied French horn for a year and then switched to a bass major. After classes, he worked on bass fundamentals listening to not only the Beatles, but also Stevie Wonder, Jimi Hendrix, Steve Miller, The Rascals, Motown, Sly & the Family Stone, among others. He would put it all into practice six sets a night playing with various local bands, including a horn band called "Goldrush."

Professional music career 
Lee then went to New York City. Trumpeter Randy Brecker called Lee out of class one day and invited him to audition for "Dreams".  In New York, Lee's career as a session musician flourished, and he toured with many artists. Lee played in the New York "24th Street Band" which had great success in Japan, giving him a solo artist career that yielded him a top 5 single. Most recently, his solo CD entitled OH! reached the #1 position on the "Jazz Beyond" chart there. 
On January 20, 2016 Lee played bass with Christopher Cross at the Moody Theater in Austin, TX at a taping for Austin City Limits.

The CBS Orchestra 
In 1982, Lee became one of the original members of The World's Most Dangerous Band, the house band on NBCs Late Night with David Letterman.  He holds the distinction of playing with Paul Shaffer, on both Late Night and the Late Show, longer than any other member of the CBS Orchestra. Before the Late Show begins taping, he often tosses out guitar picks to the audience as souvenirs. On the May 13, 2015 episode of the Late Show with David Letterman, as Letterman was interviewing Paul Shaffer, Shaffer gave recognition to the members of his band, and lastly mentioned Lee as the "man has been with us on bass since the first night we were on Late Night, Will Lee."

Awards and honors 
 NARAS MVP Award for bass guitar, 1979, 1982, 1985–1987
 NARAS MVP Award for male session singer, 1987
 NARAS MVP Virtuoso Award for bass guitar, 1989
 Grammy Award for Best Large Jazz Ensemble Album, Some Skunk Funk, with Michael Brecker, Randy Brecker, Peter Erskine, Jim Beard, Vince Mendoza, Marcio Doctor, and the WDR Big Band, 2006
 Inducted into the Musicians Hall of Fame and Museum in 2014

Basses 
Lee uses the Sadowsky Will Lee model, 4 and 5-string Fender Jazz-style basses with a narrower nut width of 1.45" [37mm] instead of the usual 1.5" [38mm], 22 frets and a Hipshot D-tuner. This is the only instrument offered by Sadowsky that has a midrange control, an on-off toggle switch selectable between 500hz and 800hz. The bass was built for him by Roger Sadowsky and has now become a production model within the line of Sadowsky basses.

Discography 
 OH! (1993)
 Birdhouse (2006)
 Love, Gratitude and Other Distractions (2013)

As sideman 

With Ace Frehley
 Ace Frehley (Casablanca, 1978)
With Patti Austin
 End of a Rainbow (CTI, 1976)
 Havana Candy (CTI, 1977)
 Body Language (CTI, 1980)
 In My Life (CTI, 1983)
With Carly Simon
 Boys in the Trees (Elektra Records, 1978)
 Spy (Elektra Records, 1979)
 Come Upstairs (Warner Bros. Records, 1980)
 Torch (Warner Bros. Records, 1981)
 My Romance (Arista Records, 1990)
 Have You Seen Me Lately (Arista Records, 1990)
With Leo Sayer
 World Radio (Chrysalis Records, 1982)
 Have You Ever Been in Love (Chrysalis Records, 1983)
With Joe Beck
 Beck (Kudu, 1975)
With Steely Dan
 Two Against Nature (Giant, 2000)
With Melissa Manchester
 Singin'... (Arista Records, 1977)
 Emergency (Arista Records, 1983)
 If My Heart Had Wings (Atlantic Records, 1995)
With Diana Ross
 I Love You (Parlophone Records, 2006)
With Delbert McClinton
 Never Been Rocked Enough (Curb, 1992)
With Nicole Renée
 Nicole Renée (Atlantic Records, 1998)
With Joan Armatrading
 Me Myself I (A&M Records, 1980)
With Major Harris
 How Do You Take Your Love (RCA Records, 1978)
With Neil Sedaka
 A Song (Elektra Records, 1977)
With Glenn Medeiros
 It's Alright to Love (Mercury Records, 1993)
With Frankie Valli
 Romantic the 60's (Universal Motown, 2007)
With Barbra Streisand
 Songbird (Columbia Records, 1978)
 Wet (Columbia Records, 1979)
With Steve Goodman
 Say It in Private (Asylum Records, 1977)
With George Benson
 Benson & Farrell with Joe Farrell (CTI, 1976)
 In Your Eyes (Warner Bros. Records, 1983)
 Love Remembers (Warner Bros. Records, 1993)
With Meco (Domenico Monardo)
 Star Wars and Other Galactic Funk (Millennium Records, 1977)
With Bonnie Tyler
 Faster Than the Speed of Night (Columbia Records, 1983)
With Janis Ian
 Janis Ian (Columbia Records, 1978)
With Al Green
 Don't Look Back (BMG, 1993)
With Sheena Easton
 What Comes Naturally (MCA Records, 1991)
With Major Harris
 How Do You Take Your Love (RCA Records, 1978)
With Janis Siegel
 At Home (Atlantic Records, 1987)
With Dan Brenner
 Little Dark Angel (2011)
With Melanie
 Phonogenic – Not Just Another Pretty Face (Midsong International, 1978)
With Michael Bolton
 The Hunger (Columbia Records, 1987)
With Irene Cara
 Anyone Can See (Elektra Records, 1982)
 What a Feelin' (Epic Records, 1983)
With Peabo Bryson
 Take No Prisoners (Elektra Records, 1985)
With Christopher Cross
 Secret Ladder (Christopher Cross Records, 2014)
 Take Me As I Am (Christopher Cross Records, 2017)
With Dionne Warwick
 Dionne (Arista Records, 1979)
 Friends Can Be Lovers (Arista Records, 1993)
With Roberta Flack
 Blue Lights in the Basement (Atlantic Records, 1977)
With Michael Franks
 Burchfield Nines (Warner Bros. Records, 1978)
 Objects of Desire (Warner Bros. Records, 1982)
 Passionfruit (Warner Bros. Records, 1983)
 Skin Dive (Warner Bros. Records, 1985)
 The Camera Never Lies (Warner Bros. Records, 1987)
 Barefoot on the Beach (Windham Hill Records, 1999)
 Time Together (Shanachie Records, 2011)
With Diane Schuur
 Talkin' 'bout You (GPR, 1988)
With Liza Minnelli
 Gently (Angel Records, 1996)
With Phoebe Snow
 Second Childhood (Columbia Records, 1976)
 Never Letting Go (Columbia Records, 1977)
 Against the Grain (Columbia Records, 1978)
With Steve Lukather
 Lukather (Columbia Records, 1989)
With Carole Bayer Sager
 Carole Bayer Sager (Elektra Records, 1977)
With Cher
 Take Me Home (Casablanca Records, 1979)
 Cher (Geffen Records, 1987)
With The Brecker Brothers
 The Brecker Bros. (Arista, 1975)
 Back to Back (Arista, 1976)
 Don't Stop the Music (Arista, 1977)
 Return of the Brecker Brothers (GRP, 1992)
With Beth Nielsen Chapman
 You Hold the Key (Reprise Records, 1993)
With Peter Allen
 I Could Have Been a Sailor (A&M Records, 1979)
With Laura Nyro
 Smile (Columbia Records, 1976)
 Nested (Columbia Records, 1978)
With James Brown
 Dead on the Heavy Funk (1975–1983)
With Hiram Bullock
 From All Sides (Atlantic, 1986)
 Give It What U Got (Atlantic, 1987)
 Way Kool (Atlantic, 1992)
 World of Collision (Big World, 1994)
 Manny's Car Wash (Big World, 1996)
 First Class Vagabond (JVC Victor, 2000)
 Guitarman (JVC Victor, 2000)
 Color Me (Via, 2001)
 Best of Hiram Bullock (WEA, 2002)
 Try Livin' It (EFA, 2003)
 Too Funky 2 Ignore (BHM, 2006)
With Cissy Houston
 Cissy Houston (Private Stock Records, 1977)
 Step Aside for a Lady (Columbia Records, 1980)
 Face to Face (BMG, 1996)
With Gary Burton
 Reunion (GRP, 1990)
 Cool Nights (GRP, 1991)
 Six Pack (GRP, 1992)
With Ringo Starr
 Ringo's Rotogravure (Polydor Records, 1976)
With Mariah Carey
 Emotions (Columbia, 1991)
With Linda Clifford
 I'll Keep on Loving You (Capitol Records, 1982)
With Bette Midler
 Bette Midler (Atlantic Records, 1973)
 Thighs and Whispers (Atlantic Records, 1979)
With D'Angelo
 Brown Sugar
With Dusty Springfield
 Living Without Your Love (Mercury Records, 1979)
With Chaka Khan
 Chaka (Atlantic, 1978)
 Chaka Khan (Warner Bros., 1982)
With Roberta Flack and Donny Hathaway
 Roberta Flack Featuring Donny Hathaway (Arista Records, 1980)
With Donald Fagen
 The Nightfly (Warner Bros. 1982)
With Cat Stevens
 Back to Earth (Island Records, 1978)
With Art Farmer
 Crawl Space (CTI, 1977)
 Yama with Joe Henderson (CTI, 1979)
With Yusef Lateef
 In a Temple Garden (CTI, 1979)
With Randy Crawford
 Raw Slik (Warner Bros. Records, 1979)
With Herbie Mann 
 Waterbed (Atlantic, 1975)
With Lalo Schifrin
 Towering Toccata (CTI, 1976)
With Don Sebesky
 The Rape of El Morro (CTI, 1975)
With Barry Manilow
 Barry Manilow II (Arista Records, 1974)
 This One's For You (Arista Records, 1976)
 Even Now (Arista Records, 1978)
 One Voice (Arista Records, 1979)
 Barry (Arista Records, 1980)
 If I Should Love Again (Arista Records, 1981)
 Manilow (RCA Records, 1985)
With Lawrence Gowan
 Great Dirty World (Columbia Records, 1987)
With Spyro Gyra
 Morning Dance (1979)
 Catching the Sun (1980)
 Carnaval (1980)
 Free Time (1981)
 Incognito (1982)
With Mike Stern
 is what it is (Atlantic, 1994)
 These Times (ESC, 2004)
 All Over the Place (Heads Up, 2012)
With David Sanborn
 Taking Off (Warner Bros. Records, 1975)
With Fred Lipsius
 Better Believe It (mja Records, 1996)

References

External links
 Official website
 Interview with Will Lee, Making It! series by Terry Wollman, at YouTube

Living people
American jazz bass guitarists
American male bass guitarists
American rock bass guitarists
American session musicians
Paul Shaffer and the World's Most Dangerous Band members
Grammy Award winners
Guitarists from New York City
Aztec Camera members
20th-century American guitarists
Jazz musicians from New York (state)
American male jazz musicians
Dreams (band) members
Year of birth missing (living people)